Kulps Corner is an unincorporated community in Bucks County, Pennsylvania, United States. Kulps Corner is located at the intersection of Pennsylvania State Routes 113 and 313 on the border of Bedminster and Hilltown townships.

References

Unincorporated communities in Bucks County, Pennsylvania
Unincorporated communities in Pennsylvania